Sarah Connor Live in Concert – A Night to Remember: Pop Meets Classic is the first live DVD released by German pop star Sarah Connor. It was recorded live on January 24, 2003 at Altes Kesselhaus in Düsseldorf, Germany.

There are three sets. The first set starts with 5 of Sarah's songs all performed in a bit of a classical way. The second set involves 4 of Sarah's more pop like tracks and more dancing. The third and final set involves covering some pop standards such as "I Say a Little Prayer" and "Summertime". The concert finishes with her signature song "From Sarah with Love" and her then current single "One Nite Stand (of Wolves and Sheep)". All the songs performed were from Sarah's first two albums, Green Eyed Soul and Unbelievable, as well as the four covers.

The DVD features a bonus track (a cover of The Beatles' "Yesterday"), a making of featurette, gallery, special web link, an interview with Connor about the songs, a discography with song snippets, and performances of two songs with multiple angles. The DVD also offers English subtitles (the songs were in English, but she spoke in German).

Track listing

Ballad set
 Overture
 That's The Way I Am
 He's Unbelievable
 Beautiful
 Where Did U Sleep Last Night?
 Skin on Skin

Pop/R&B set
 Bounce
 In My House
 If U Were My Man
 Let's Get Back to Bed – Boy!

Covers set
 Get Here
 I Say a Little Prayer
 A Natural Woman
 Summertime

Finale
 From Sarah with Love
 One Nite Stand (of Wolves and Sheep)
 Yesterday (bonus track)

Charts

External links
Official Site

Sarah Connor (singer) video albums
2003 video albums
Live video albums
2003 live albums